San Rafael City Schools is a school district headquartered in San Rafael, California, United States.

The district, according to the San Rafael city charter, is composed of two separate boundaries: the San Rafael Elementary School District and the San Rafael High School District , which are governed by the same board of education. The elementary zone covers the southern half of the city, while the separate Miller Creek Elementary School District covers the northern half. The high school zone covers all of the city. In addition, San Quentin Village and part of Larkspur are within the two districts' boundaries.

Schools

San Rafael Elementary School District
The San Rafael Elementary School District is one part of the San Rafael City Schools.  San Rafael City Schools shares a common elected Board of Education and centralized district office support services. The Board includes:

 Linda M. Jackson, Board President
 Paul M. Cohen, Board Vice-President
 Greg Knell, Board Member
 Jon Loberg, Board Member
 Natu Tuatagaloa, Board Member
 Superintendent of Schools  Michael Watenpaugh, Ed.D
 Deputy Superintendent Rebecca Rosales

Elementary schools

 Bahia Vista Elementary School is located in southeast San Rafael. It serves the communities of east of Highway 101 and south of the San Rafael Canal, including the portion of Larkspur within the districts' boundaries as well as San Quentin Village.
 Coleman Elementary School is located east of U.S. Route 101 near central San Rafael. It serves the neighborhood near Dominican University of California, the area near San Rafael High School, and downtown San Rafael.
 Glenwood Elementary School is located east of central San Rafael and primarily serves students from eastern San Rafael as well as overflow students from other areas of San Rafael.
 Laurel Dell Elementary School is a small multi-age and multi-cultural school located in central San Rafael.
 San Pedro Elementary School is located east of downtown San Rafael. It serves the communities east of Highway 101 and the area south of the San Rafael Canal.
 Short Elementary School is located in the Gerstle Park neighborhood of San Rafael.  This school reopened in August 2010 due to the continued enrollment growth in the elementary school district.  For 2010-11 the school will house preschool and kindergarten students.
 Sun Valley Elementary School is at the western end of San Rafael and serves the western portion of San Rafael.
 Venetia Valley K-8 School is located in northern San Rafael near the Marin County Civic Center. It serves the areas of Los Ranchitos and Santa Venetia.

Middle schools
 James B. Davidson Middle School- located in the central section of San Rafael. Students attending Bahia Vista, Coleman, Glenwood, Laurel Dell, San Pedro and Sun Valley Elementary Schools attend Davidson. Some Venetia Valley students also choose to attend Davidson Middle School. 
 Venetia Valley K-8 School- renamed after school was remodeled. First graduate of school was Joseph Gabriel class of '07

San Rafael High School District

Continuation high schools
 Madrone Continuation High School is a public secondary school located on the San Rafael High School campus. The school principal is Jane Songer.  Madrone Continuation High School provides alternative education for students in grades ten through twelve, emphasizing individual attention for students with special needs.  In 2006, the school scored 575 on the Academic Performance Index (API), the California Department of Education's program for measuring school accountability.  It also passed all Adequate Yearly Performance (AYP) criteria required by the federal No Child Left Behind (NCLB) Act of 2001.  Students in the San Rafael High School District may enter Madrone with a recommendation from the district referral committee.

Comprehensive high schools

 San Rafael High School is located in central San Rafael, east of Highway 101.
 Terra Linda High School is located in northern San Rafael, west of Highway 101.

External links
 San Rafael City Schools

School districts in Marin County, California
Education in San Rafael, California